Upon This Rock is the debut solo album by pioneering Christian rock musician Larry Norman, released in 1969. It is considered to be "the first full-blown Christian rock album" and was produced by Hal Yoergler.

Background
In 1969 Norman returned to Capitol Records, now headed by Mike Curb, to honor his original 1966 contract with the understanding that he would have complete artistic control. Believing that "Kids just don't want to listen to God's empty songs anymore", in December 1969 Capitol released Norman's first solo rock album, Upon This Rock, "the first major label record to marry rock music with the gospel". "the Sergeant Pepper of Christianity", widely regarded as "the album that first recruited rock in the service of salvation", later cited as being "one of the roots of the current Contemporary Christian Music"; and now considered to be the first full-blown Christian rock album".

Upon This Rock, whose music was "a blend of folk, psychedelic, and rock influences", combined "street language and gritty imagery". In August 1970 he described the album as "simply ... twelve love songs to Jesus", whereas Don Cusic believes that "these songs tended to be darker than the early Christian cheerleader type of songs coming from other early Jesus music artists".

Release and reception

While Norman was denounced by television evangelists like Bob Larson; Jimmy Swaggart, who called rock music "the new pornography"; and Jerry Falwell; and others within the conservative religious establishment, who considered the development of Christian rock-and-roll, "a sinful compromise with worldliness and immoral sensuality", his music gained a large following in the emerging counter cultural movements. However, not all critics were impressed with this album. For example, a writer in Entertainment World called Norman "a hermaphrodite" and wrote "Faith can move mountains, so it may move this incredible hunk of hubris". while another, who described Upon This Rock as "a musical misery tour", and wrote: "God didn't give Larry Norman a voice — a recording contract, but not a voice". Another reviewer wrote: "In "Ha Ha World," Neil Young's "Mr. Soul" is thinly and lethargically evoked. Ditto a Jim Morrison effect on "The Last Supper." And shades of Art Garfunkel on the ballad "I Wish We'd All Been Ready".

In February 1970, two months after Upon This Rock was released, Capitol dropped Norman from their label, as the album was deemed a "commercial flop" as it had failed to reach the sales target Capitol expected, telling Norman that "there is no market for your music." Norman analyzed its poor reception in a 1972 interview: "It was too religious for the rock and roll stores and too rock and roll for the religious stores." In April 1970 Capitol leased Upon This Rock to Heartwarming/Impact Records for two years and a small sum. While Norman decided to leave Capitol Records in protest, because he had a different audience in mind, he cooperated with the re-release of Upon This Rock:
I gave my permission, did a special re-mix for the Southern record label in Nashville, diplomatically hoping to soften the cultural blow by lessening the distortion and percussion in favour of the lyrics and harmonies. After all, I had no desire to unnecessarily make enemies with the brethren or to cause them to stumble. Yet at the same time I had very little interest in cultivating endorsements from the Church. I was out to create a dialogue with people who believed they hated God. I wanted to be on the battlefield, fighting a spiritual battle, trying to convince and convert the undecided and get them to cross the battle line to stand together with other new believers. Though I may have been in error in standing aside from the brethren by not performing for them, the established Church was simply immaterial to me.

Upon This Rock received increased sales due to its distribution in Christian bookstores, and "became Benson's most acclaimed release", selling 23,000 copies when it was eventually released in England in 1972 through Key Records. In 1971 Upon This Rock was submitted unsuccessfully for Grammy Award nomination.

By May 1970 Capitol released a single (Capitol 2766) with both songs from Upon This Rock: "Sweet Sweet Song Of Salvation" backed with "Walking Backwards Down The Stairs".

Tracks

Original LP release
Upon This Rock (Capitol 1969)
Produced by Hal Yoergler

Side 1
 "Prelude"
 "You Can't Take Away the Lord"
 "I Don't Believe in Miracles"
 "Moses in the Wilderness"
 "Walking Backwards Down the Stairs"
 "Ha Ha World"

Side 2
 "Sweet Sweet Song of Salvation"
 "Forget Your Hexagram"
 "The Last Supper"
 "I Wish We'd All Been Ready"
 "Nothing Really Changes"
 "Postlude"

Extra tracks on some CD releases
 "You Can't Take Away the Lord" (demo)
 "Sweet Sweet Song of Salvation" (live)
 "Nothing Really Changes" (demo)

Personnel

 Larry Norman – vocals, guitar, piano
 Joe Osborn – bass
 Hal Blaine – drums
 Mike Deasy – acoustic guitar
 Larry Knechtel – keyboards
 The Inspirations – backing vocals
 Annie, Matthew and Nelly – backing vocals
The Dannie Belles – backing vocals on the song "I Wish We'd All Been Ready"

See also
 Larry Norman discography

References

Notes

1969 debut albums
Larry Norman albums
Contemporary Christian music albums by American artists